Trevor Hale Enders (born December 22, 1974) is a former Major League Baseball player. Born to William Enders and Barbara (nee Frost).  Born in Milwaukee, WI.  He and his family moved to Northbrook, Illinois and then to Houston, TX when he was young.  He was a pitcher who batted right-handed, threw left-handed, and is 6 foot 1. He attended college at Houston Baptist University. Trevor played one season in the Majors as a member of the Tampa Bay Devil Rays in the  season. In nine career games pitched in relief, Enders had an 0-1 record in 9.1 innings pitched, allowed 14 hits and had 5 strikeouts.

External links

Trevor Enders at Baseball Almanac

1974 births
Living people
Houston Christian Huskies baseball players
Sportspeople from Harris County, Texas
People from Katy, Texas
Baseball players from Milwaukee
Major League Baseball pitchers
Tampa Bay Devil Rays players
Nashua Pride players
Butte Copper Kings players
Charleston RiverDogs players
Durham Bulls players
Orlando Rays players
St. Petersburg Devil Rays players